Hursti is a surname. Notable people with the surname include:

Harri Hursti (born 1968), Finnish computer programmer
Veikko Hursti (1924–2005), Finnish philanthropist

Finnish-language surnames